The Church of St James the Great is a Church of England parish church in Colchester, Essex. The church is a grade II* listed building.

History
The church was originally built from the 13th to 15th centuries. It was restored from 1870 to 1871 by Samuel Sanders Teulon.

On 24 February 1950, the church was designated a grade II* listed building.

Present day
The Church of St James the Great is part of the Parish of St. James and St. Paul Colchester in the Archdeaconry of Colchester in the Diocese of Chelmsford.

The parish stands in Traditional Catholic tradition of the Church of England. As it rejects the ordination of women, the parish receives alternative episcopal oversight from the Bishop of Richborough (currently Norman Banks).

Notable people
 Robert Springett, later Bishop of Tewkesbury, served his curacy here

Gallery

References

External links

 Parish website
 A Church Near You entry

Grade II* listed churches in Essex
Church of England church buildings in Essex
Anglo-Catholic churches in England receiving AEO
13th-century church buildings in England